Quantum Energy Partners is a Houston, Texas-based private equity firm focused on the energy industry.

History
The company was co-founded by S. Wil VanLoh, Jr. and Toby Neugebauer in 1998.

References

Financial services companies established in 1998
Energy companies of the United States
Venture capital firms of the United States
Companies based in Houston
Energy companies established in 1998
Non-renewable resource companies established in 1998
Private equity firms of the United States